Iridomyrmex luteoclypeatus is a species of ant in the genus Iridomyrmex. Described by Heterick and Shattuck in 2011, nothing is essentially known about the ant, other than the ant being found in the drier regions of Australia and is diurnal.

Etymology
The name derives from the Latin language, which luteus translates to 'yellow' and clypeatus  translates to 'shield-shaped'.

References

Iridomyrmex
Hymenoptera of Australia
Insects described in 2011